High Seas is the fourth album by the American alternative country band Trailer Bride. It was released in 2001 on Bloodshot Records.

Reception

A review of High Seas in the magazine No Depression described the album as "...A spooky, swampy triumph....unsettling and addictive with each subsequent spin..." The Chicago Tribunes Chris Nelson wrote in his review that "on High Seas...things are indeed odd, but they're also well executed, from the creepy to the caring and all emotional stops between."

Greil Marcus named the album his 2nd favorite rock album of 2001, writing that the band "...sounds like an old motel on Route 66 looks".

Track listing
All songs written by Melissa Swingle except noted.
 "Jesco" - 3:27  
 "High Seas" - 2:59  
 "Under Your Spell" - 3:06 
 "Itchin' for You" - 2:22
 "Ghost of Mae West" - 3:39 
 "Wilderness" - 1:59 
 "Crickets" - 0:23
 "Thankful Dirt" - 3:05 
 "Barcelona" - 3:06
 "Drift in D" (Daryl White) - 2:52 
 "All Thine" - 2:43
 "Run Rosie Run" - 2:59 
 "Bird Feet Feelings" - 3:19

Personnel
 Brad Goolsby - drums
 Scott Goolsby - guitar
 Melissa Swingle - vocals, banjo, guitar, harmonica, piano, saw  
 Daryl White - bass

References

2001 albums
Trailer Bride albums
Bloodshot Records albums